Ismoil Somoni may refer to:

Ismail Samani (died 907), amir of Transoxiana and Khorasan
Ismoil Somoni Peak, the highest mountain in Tajikistan, and formerly highest in the Soviet Union
Ismoili Somoni, a town in Tajikistan